Idaho caucus could refer to:
 Idaho Democratic caucuses, 2008
 Idaho Republican primary, 2008
 Idaho Republican caucuses, 2012
 Idaho Democratic caucuses, 2016
Caucuses in the United States